1,3-Dichloropropan-2-ol (1,3-DCP) is an organic compound with the formula HOCH2CHClCH2Cl.  It is a colorless liquid.  It is an intermediate in the production of epichlorohydrin.

1,3-DCP is a believed to be a carcinogen and mutagen.  The International Agency for Research on Cancer classifies it as a Group 2B carcinogen ("possibly carcinogenic to humans").

Along with 3-monochloropropane-1,2-diol (3-MCPD), 1,3-DCP is found in some Asian style sauces such as soy sauce and oyster sauce.

References

Secondary alcohols
Organochlorides
IARC Group 2B carcinogens